Janków may refer to the following places in Poland:
Janków, Lower Silesian Voivodeship (south-west Poland)
Janków, Gmina Łęczyca in Łódź Voivodeship (central Poland)
Janków, Gmina Piątek in Łódź Voivodeship (central Poland)
Janków, Tomaszów Mazowiecki County in Łódź Voivodeship (central Poland)
Janków, Kalisz County in Greater Poland Voivodeship (west-central Poland)
Janków, Pleszew County in Greater Poland Voivodeship (west-central Poland)
Janków, West Pomeranian Voivodeship (north-west Poland)